SS Re d'Italia was an Italian ocean liner for Lloyd Sabaudo named for the King of Italy. Launched in 1906, she sailed between Italy and New York and South America for most of her career. During World War I she was employed as a troopship carrying United States troops to France as part of the United States Navy Cruiser and Transport Force. She was scrapped in 1929.

Early career 
Re d'Italia, was built by Sir J. Laing & Sons Ltd. of Sunderland, with steam engines provided by G. Clark Ltd. of Sunderland. Launched on 22 December 1906 for Lloyd Sabaudo, she sailed on her maiden voyage from Genoa to Palermo, Naples, and New York on 6 April 1907. Continuing on Mediterranean–New York service, Re d'Italia sailed opposite of Principe di Piemonte on the route through about 1910, and  through about 1916. In 1917, Re d'Italia, by this time the only Lloyd Sabaudo ship sailing to the United States, made four roundtrips to New York.

U.S. troopship duties 
Beginning in May 1918, Re d'Italia was chartered as a United States troop transport and attached to the United States Navy Cruiser and Transport Force.

After arriving in France on 30 May, Re d'Italia returned to the United States in mid June.

Re d'Italia returned to Virginia on 21 July with Caserta.

The convoy arrived in France on 12 August. Re d'Italia arrived back in Virginia on 24 August.

The Italian liner made additional crossings in September and October, returning after the latter on 17 November, six days after the Armistice.

Later career 
Re d'Italias first voyage after the Armistice was from Genoa to Marseille and New York on 27 April 1919. In 1920, she was refitted to carry second- and third-class passengers only. She continued Mediterranean–New York sailings until 1922 when she was transferred to South American service. On 26 October 1923 she made one roundtrip from Genoa to Naples, Palermo, and New York. She was scrapped at Genoa in 1929.

Notes

References 

 

1906 ships
Ocean liners
Ships built on the River Tyne
Troop ships of the United States
World War I passenger ships of Italy